Deutsche Jugendkraft Würzburg, commonly known as DJK Würzburg, is a German sports club. It is most known for its basketball section, which in the past had a professional team. Its most known former player is Dirk Nowitzki.

Currently, the sports club contains around 3,000 amateur players.

History
The DJK Sport Association was founded on September 16, 1920 in Würzburg. Due to the geographic location of its home office, the DJK soon founded a local club in Würzburg. However, the different athletic departments found themselves divided among various Catholic clubs. During the Third Reich, all Nazi Germany DJK affiliates were banned by the government. After World War II, the DJK consolidated all of its local departments into DJK Würzburg. Today the club has over 3000 members, including a variety of non-Catholic members.

The club's top women's handball team played in the Handball-Bundesliga Frauen, the top flight of women's handball in Germany, from 1976 to 1985, during the 1987–88 season and from 1993 to 1995.

The club's basketball department gained fame in the 1990s as both the men's and women's teams qualified for the top German Basketball Bundesliga (BBL) division. The women's team played many years in the first and second divisions and was crowned German Champion in 1993. In 1989, the men's team made the jump into the second division. In 1997, featuring Dirk Nowitzki in the line-up, DJK Würzburg claimed the 2nd Division South title, qualifying for the Basketball Bundesliga. In 2001, DJK spun off its men's basketball team into a private corporate entity, now known as s.Oliver Würzburg, to capitalize on their growth as a professional basketball team. DJK Würzburg has produced numerous players who have gone on to have success in the BBL, with the senior men's German national basketball team and, for Nowitzki, the NBA.

In 2005, the club resigned its spot in the BBL and the club stopped competing.

External links
Official website (in German)

Basketball teams in Germany